Borvayeh (also Romanized as Borvāyeh; also known as Al Barwāya, Al Būravāyeh, Barvāyeh, and Borvāyeh-e Kūchek) is a village in Elhayi Rural District, in the Central District of Ahvaz County, Khuzestan Province, Iran. At the 2006 census, its population was 490, in 87 families.

References 

Populated places in Ahvaz County